Zeuxis is a genus of sea snails, marine gastropod mollusks in the family Nassariidae, the Nassa mud snails or dog whelks.

Zeuxis has been made a synonym of Nassarius Duméril, 1805.

Species
Species within the genus Zeuxis include:
 Zeuxis (Tarazeuxis) sufflatus (Gould, 1860): synonym of Nassarius sufflatus (Gould, 1860)
 Zeuxis (Tarazeuxis) velatus (Gould, 1877): synonym of Nassarius reeveanus (Dunker, 1847)
 Zeuxis caelatus (A. Adams, 1852): synonym of Nassarius caelatus (A. Adams, 1852)
 Zeuxis concinus (Powys, 1835): synonym of Nassarius concinnus (Powys, 1835)
 Zeuxis dorsatus (Röding, 1798): synonym of Nassarius dorsatus (Röding, 1798)
 Zeuxis hayashii Habe, 1961: synonym of Nassarius subtranslucidus (E. A. Smith, 1903)
 Zeuxis hirasei (Kuroda & Habe, 1952): synonym of Nassarius hirasei Kuroda & Habe, 1952
 Zeuxis kiiensis Kira, 1954: synonym of Nassarius kiiensis Kira, 1954
 Zeuxis kometubus (Otuka, 1934) †: synonym of Nassarius kometubus Otuka, 1934 †
 Zeuxis margaritiferus (Dunker, 1847): synonym of Nassarius margaritifer (Dunker, 1847)
 Zeuxis micans (A. Adams, 1852): synonym of Nassarius unicolor (Hombron & Jacquinot, 1848)
 Zeuxis mitralis (A. Adams, 1852): synonym of Nassarius fuscus (Hombron & Jacquinot, 1848)
 Zeuxis nakayamai Habe, 1958: synonym of Nassarius nakayamai (Habe, 1958)
 Zeuxis noguchii Habe, 1958: synonym of Nassarius noguchii (Habe, 1958)
 Zeuxis olivaceus (Marrat, 1877): synonym of Nassarius olivaceus (Bruguière, 1789)
 Zeuxis semiplicata (A. Adams, 1852): synonym of Nassarius sinarus (Philippi, 1851)
 Zeuxis succinctus (A. Adams, 1852): synonym of Nassarius succinctus (A. Adams, 1852)
 Zeuxis taenia (Gmelin, 1791): synonym of Nassarius olivaceus (Bruguière, 1789)
 Zeuxis tateyamensis (Kuroda, 1929): synonym of Nassarius tateyamensis Kuroda, 1929
 Zeuxis teretiuscula (A. Adams, 1852): synonym of Nassarius teretiusculus (A. Adams, 1852)
 Zeuxis varicifera (A. Adams, 1852): synonym of Nassarius variciferus (A. Adams, 1852)
 Zeuxis velatus (Gould, 1877): synonym of Nassarius reeveanus (Dunker, 1847)

References

Nassariidae
Monotypic gastropod genera